A  is a  long, single (or rare double-edged) knife without ornamental fittings housed in a plain mount.

Uses 
It was once carried by men and women of the samurai class in Japan. It was useful for self-defense in indoor spaces where the long blade katana and intermediate sword wakizashi were inconvenient. Women carried them in their kimono either in a pocket-like space (futokoro) or in the sleeve pouch (tamoto) for self-defense and for ritual suicide by slashing the veins in the left side of the neck. When a samurai woman married, she was expected to carry a kaiken with her when she moved in with her husband.  

In modern Japan, a kaiken is worn as a traditional accessory for formal kimono, such as a furisode, uchikake and a shiromuku, tucked into their obi.

Orthography 

Due to pronunciation changes over time, the kwaiken is now called a kaiken. The kaiken is also referred to as a futokoro-gatana or a mamori-gatana (守り刀; "protection sword/blade").

See also
 Japanese sword
 Tantō

References

External links

 
 Nihonto message board forum
 Richard Stein's Japanese sword guide
Japan Arts Council e-book Mamori-gatana pp. 179–180

Samurai swords
Japanese sword types
Japanese knives